Mike Morgan (1929 – 5 June 1958), born John Michael Pughe-Morgan, was a British actor. He appeared in several TV programmes and made his film acting debut in the 1957 film comedy Barnacle Bill, which starred Sir Alec Guinness.

Morgan played a much larger role in another film with Guinness, The Horse's Mouth, as Nosey, a sidekick of Guinness's character, Gulley Jimson.  However, shortly before filming ended, he fell ill with meningitis and died before the film was completed; some of his lines were therefore dubbed by another actor.

Personal life
Morgan was married to actress Elvi Hale until his death in 1958.

References

External links
 
 Answers.com

1929 births
1958 deaths
English male film actors
Deaths from meningitis
Date of birth missing
Male actors from London
20th-century English male actors
Neurological disease deaths in England
Infectious disease deaths in England